The 2006 Danmark Rundt was a men's road bicycle race held from 2 to 6 August 2006. Swiss rider Fabian Cancellara of Team CSC captured the overall title. It was the 16th edition of the men's stage race, which was established in 1985.

Stages

Stage 1: Frederikshavn–Viborg, Denmark (210 km)
The 2006 Danmark Rundt started in Frederikshavn and the first stage took the riders across Vendsyssel before turning south towards Viborg. This was also the race's longest stage.

Route: Frederikshavn–Hjørring–Løkken–Brovst–Løgstør–Farsø–Gedsted–Skals–Viborg, ending with 2 laps of 4.5 km.

Results

This meant that Aitor Galos Alonso lead the general classification, as well as the point classification. Aart Vierhouten lead the hill competition, Alex Rasmussen held the youth jersey, Jacob Nielsen the fighter jersey and  lead the team competition.

Stage 2: Aalestrup–Vejle (185 km)
Stage 2 took the riders south through Jutland, reaching the race's highest point some 170 metres above sea level at Yding Skovhøj. The stage also featured a rough 21% climb on Kiddesvej in Vejle which was included on both of the final laps.

Route: Aalestrup–Møldrup–Viborg–Dollerup Bakker–Kjellerup–Silkeborg–Gl. Rye–Yding Skovhøj–Uldum–Vejle, ending with 2 laps of 5.5 km.

Results

This means that Fabian Cancellara moved into yellow and took the white youth-jersey too, although Aitor Galdos Alonso retained the dark-purple point-jersey. Aart Vierhouten kept the dotted hill-jersey, and Maarten Tjallingi took the fighter-jersey.  Team CSC moved into first in the team classification.

Stage 3: Kolding–Odense (205 km)
The third stage reached the Little Belt Bridge before following the western and south coast of Funen until Svendborg, then heading north to the island's largest city, Odense.

Route: Kolding–Middelfart–Assens–Hårby–Faaborg–Svendborg–Ringe–Odense, ending with 2 laps of 4.4 km.

Results

After stage 3, Stuart O'Grady held the yellow and purple jerseys. Aart Vierhouten kept the dotted jersey, and Fabian Cancellara was still the best youngster. Jacob Nielsen took the fighter jersey, and Team CSC was still on top of the team-leaderboard.

Stage 4: Sorø–Hillerød (100 km)
Stage 4 was a so-called "half-stage", with an individual time trial being held in the evening of 5 August. The stage went north-east from Sorø through Tølløse, birth city of 2005 and 2006 Tour de France polka-dot winner Michael Rasmussen, on its way to Hillerød.

Route: Sorø–Stenlille–Tølløse–Kirke Hyllinge–Skibby–Frederikssund–Slangerup–Hillerød, ending with 2 laps of 4.0 km.

Results

No classements got new leaders in this short stage, leaving O'Grady leading the individual classification and CSC the team classification.

Stage 5: Elsinore (14 km, ITT)
Stage 5, the penultimate stage, was a short individual time trial. A few days before this stage, it was shortened from 15.5 to 14 km. The stage took place on the same day as stage 4.

Route (streets are unlinked): Kronborgvej–Ndr. Strandvej–Hellebæk–Ålsgårde (turning point)–Hellebæk–Elsinore–Kronborgvej

Results

Stage 6: Gilleleje–Frederiksberg (156 km)
The final stage crossed Benbrækkeren, a steep hill in northern Zealand, before ending with the traditional finish at Frederiksberg Allé.

Route: Gilleleje–"Benbrækkeren"–Helsinge–Hillerød–Blovstrød–Vedbæk–Frederiksberg, ending with 10 laps of 6.0 km.

 Stage winner: Robert Förster

Participation list
The peloton consisted of 125 riders on 16 teams (7–8 per team). This is the list of the participants, as seen on the official site.

*Team Post Danmark is a team of Danish riders, whose teams don't enter the race. Post Danmark is sponsor for the national team, so therefore the team is registered as a national one.

References
cyclingnews

External links
 Official site

 

2006
2006 in road cycling
2006 in Danish sport
August 2006 sports events in Europe